Adam Ross may refer to:

 Adam Ross (author) (born 1967), American novelist and short story writer
 Adam Ross (CSI: NY), a fictional character on the television series CSI: NY
 Adam Ross (musician), Los Angeles-based guitarist, songwriter, and producer
Adam Ross, frontman of the Scottish indie-pop band Randolph's Leap (band)

See also
 Adam of Ross (fl. 1279), Irish Cistercian monk